Lo and Behold, Reveries of the Connected World is a 2016 American documentary film directed by Werner Herzog. In it, Herzog ponders the existential impact of the Internet, robotics, artificial intelligence, the Internet of Things, and more on human life. The film premiered at the 2016 Sundance Film Festival, and was sponsored by the company NetScout. The film contains interviews with Bob Kahn, Elon Musk, Sebastian Thrun, Ted Nelson, and other leaders of the technology world.

Synopsis
Herzog narrates over footage of the University of California at Los Angeles, where pioneering work building the Internet took place, and looks at the first piece of Internet equipment ever to be installed. The film then explores the positive and negative impacts the Internet has had on society. Herzog interviews a family that has been harassed online after the death of their daughter.

An institute where no electronic equipment is allowed within a 3-mile radius is examined, and people living in this area describe their experience. The film comes to a group of people that are afflicted with an electromagnetism sensitivity condition who have to live in this area.

Elon Musk and his quest to send humans to Mars are investigated. Artificial intelligence is touched upon and the film comes to focus on how robots could become replacements for human interaction in the future. At the end of the film, Herzog poses the question to multiple interviewees, "Can the Internet dream of itself?"

Themes
When asked by TechCrunch.com what effect could the film have on the audience, Herzog replied:

Reception 
Lo and Behold has received generally favorable reviews from critics. On review aggregator website Rotten Tomatoes, the film has a 93% approval rating based on 141 reviews, with an average rating of 7.5 out of 10. On Metacritic, the film has a weighted average score of 76 out of 100 based on 28 critics, indicating "generally favorable reviews".

References

External links
 
 
 
 

2016 films
American documentary films
Anthropology documentary films
Films directed by Werner Herzog
2016 documentary films
ARPANET
History of the Internet
Documentary films about the Internet
Films about artificial intelligence
Government by algorithm in fiction
2010s English-language films
2010s American films